Gutenstein may mean:
A district of the city of Sigmaringen: Gutenstein (Sigmaringen)
A municipality in Lower Austria: Gutenstein, Austria
The German name for the Slovenian town of Ravne na Koroškem